Haidar Abashidze (15 August 1893 – 3 January 1966) was a Georgian politician, journalist, and educator from the Muslim community of Adjara.

Born in Batum, then part of the Russian Empire, of a Muslim Georgian noble family of the beys of Adjara, Abashidze studied at a local Georgian school and then at a college in Ottoman Turkey. In 1913 he began teaching at schools in Adjara and published in the local press, championing the pro-Georgian orientation among the Muslim Adjarains. He further sympathized with the social-democratic revolutionaries and was persecuted by the Russian government. Between 1918 and 1920, together with Mehmed Abashidze, he was a driving force behind the Liberation Committee of Muslim Georgia, an organization that was active during the Turkish and then British occupation of Batum, advocating incorporation of the region into a newly independent Georgia. After the Soviet takeover of Georgia, he withdrew from politics and died in Tbilisi in 1966. He was buried at the Didube Pantheon of Writers and Public Figures in Tbilisi.

Several authors, dealing with the World War I-era Caucasian affairs, confuse Haidar Abashidze with Prince Kita Abashidze, a Georgian Social Federalist and member of the Ozakom.

References 

1893 births
1966 deaths
Burials at Didube Pantheon
People from Batumi
People from Kutais Governorate
Muslims from Georgia (country)
Politicians from Georgia (country)
Journalists from Georgia (country)
Educators from Georgia (country)
20th-century journalists